Cindy Decker (later known as Cindy Decker Kutiel) is a fictional character in a series of mystery novels by Faye Kellerman. She is the daughter of the protagonist, Los Angeles police lieutenant Peter Decker, by his first marriage. While Cindy and her mother Jan are Jewish, they are not as religiously observant as Peter's second wife Rina Lazarus.

Novels in the series
 The Ritual Bath (1986)
 Sacred and Profane (1987)
 Milk and Honey (1990)
 Day of Atonement (1991)
 False Prophet (1992)
 Grievous Sin (1993)
 Sanctuary (1994)
 Justice (1995)
 Prayers for the Dead (1996)
 Serpent's Tooth (1997)
 Jupiter's Bones (1999)
 Stalker (2000)
 The Forgotten (2001)
 Stone Kiss (2002)
 Street Dreams (2004)

Plot summary
Cindy is a teenager in the earliest books, but takes on a more active role in solving crimes in later novels and eventually follows her father into the police force.

In Grievous Sin, Cindy helps care for her infant half-sister Hannah Decker, after her stepmother has a difficult childbirth, and helps investigate the disappearance of another infant from the hospital ward where Hannah is being cared for. In Stalker, she is a highly motivated, university-educated police rookie who comes into an explosive conflict with very corrupt criminal fellow police officers. In Street Dreams, Cindy investigates the case of an abandoned infant, and dates and eventually marries a male nurse and  Ethiopian-Israeli Jew, Yaakov ("Koby") Kutiel.

Fictional detectives
Fictional police officers
Novel series by featured character
Characters in American novels
Fictional Los Angeles Police Department detectives
Fictional Jews